Michaël Llodra and Nenad Zimonjić were the defending champions but decided not to participate.
Bob and Mike Bryan won the title, defeating Carlos Berlocq and Denis Istomin 6–3, 6–2 in the final.

Seeds

Draw

Draw

References
 Main Draw

China Open - Doubles